Autumn Leaves is a live album by jazz saxophonist Cannonball Adderley recorded at the Kosei-nenkin Kaikan and Sankei Hall in Tokyo during his 1963 Japanese tour and featuring performances by Adderley with Nat Adderley, Yusef Lateef, Joe Zawinul, Sam Jones and Louis Hayes. The album was released on the Japanese Riverside label and features additional material from the Sankai Hall concert that produced Adderley's Nippon Soul (1963) and additional performances from a concert recorded a week earlier. Both albums were released on the US compilation The Japanese Concerts in 1975.

Track listing
 'Work Song" (Nat Adderley) - 9:06 
 "Autumn Leaves" (Joseph Kosma, Jacques Prévert) - 7:27
 "Dizzy's Business" (Ernie Wilkins) - 6:01
 "Primitivo" (J. Adderley) - 12:12
 "Jive Samba" (N. Adderley) - 10:37
Recorded at Koseinenkin Kaikan in Tokyo, Japan, on July 9 (tracks 1, 3 & 4), and Sankei Hall in Tokyo, Japan, on July 14 (track 2) and 15 (track 5), 1963

Personnel
Cannonball Adderley - alto saxophone
Nat Adderley - cornet
Yusef Lateef - tenor saxophone, flute, oboe
Joe Zawinul - piano
Sam Jones - bass
Art Blakey - drums

References

1963 live albums
Cannonball Adderley live albums
Riverside Records live albums